Reinhart Frederick George Schlichting (May 23, 1835July 6, 1897) was a German American immigrant, businessman, and Democratic politician.  He served two years in the Wisconsin State Senate representing Calumet County and southern Outagamie County.  During the American Civil War, he served as a Union Army officer.

Biography

Born in the Oldenburg, in what is now northwest Germany, Schlichting was educated in the Oldenburg city schools until age 12, when he emigrated with his parents to the United States.  They immediately settled at Sheboygan Falls, Wisconsin, and Reinhard labored to assist his father in clearing land and establishing a homestead.

During the American Civil War, Schlichting served in the 9th Wisconsin Infantry Regiment and in the 45th Wisconsin Infantry Regiment. After the war, in 1865, he moved to Chilton, Wisconsin, where he purchased a hotel and operated it for the next six years.  After selling his hotel, he operated a hub-and-spoke manufacturing business, and then purchased and ran a drug store in Chilton.

He became a leading citizen in Chilton and was elected to several local offices.  He was chairman of the town board and served on the school board.  In the Fall election of 1866 he was elected district attorney of Calumet County.  In 1873 he won election to the Wisconsin State Senate running on the Reform Party ticket, and served in the 1874 and 1875 sessions.  In 1887, he was elected mayor of Chilton, and was re-elected without opposition in 1888.

For the last decade of his life, he was employed as the manager of the Calumet County operations of the Pabst Brewing Company.  He died of sudden heart failure in his bed at Chilton, Wisconsin.

References

External links

1835 births
1897 deaths
German emigrants to the United States
People from Oldenburg (city)
People from Chilton, Wisconsin
People from Sheboygan Falls, Wisconsin
People of Wisconsin in the American Civil War
Businesspeople from Wisconsin
Wisconsin Reformers (19th century)
Mayors of places in Wisconsin
School board members in Wisconsin
Wisconsin state senators
19th-century American politicians
19th-century American businesspeople